Mu‘āwīyya or Muawiyah or Muaawiya is a male Arabic given name of disputed meaning. It was the name of the first Umayyad caliph.

Notable bearers of this name include:

 Mu'awiya I (602–680), first Umayyad Caliph (r. 661–680)
 Muawiya II (661–684), third Umayyad Caliph (r. 683–684)
 Mu'awiya ibn Hudayj, Umayyad general and governor
 Mu'awiya ibn Hisham (died 737), Umayyad prince and general (fl. 725–737)
 Maaouya Ould Sid'Ahmed Taya (born 1941), Prime-Minister, then President of Mauritania

Places 

 Mu'awiya, Basma, an Arab village in Israel

References

External links 

 Ruling on calling one’s son Mu’aawiyah and mention of some who bore this name "